Jonathan Nicolás Rossi Acuña (born 16 May 1998) is a Uruguayan footballer who plays as a goalkeeper for Defensor Sporting in the Uruguayan Primera División.

Career

Rentistas
A graduate of the club's youth academy, Rossi made his league debut for the club on 3 December 2016, playing the entirety of a 1–0 victory over Torque.

References

External links
Nicolás Rossi at Football Database

1998 births
Living people
Footballers from Montevideo
Uruguayan people of Italian descent
Uruguayan footballers
Association football goalkeepers
C.A. Rentistas players
Uruguayan Primera División players
Uruguayan Segunda División players